Bucsa is a village in Békés County, in the Southern Great Plain region of south-east Hungary.

Geography
It covers an area of 55.84 km² and has a population of 2179 people (2015).

References

Populated places in Békés County